Carole Taylor,  (born Carol Goss on November 16, 1945) is a Canadian school chancellor, journalist and former politician.
She also served as the Chancellor of Simon Fraser University from June 2011 until June 2014. She previously served as British Columbia's Minister of Finance from 2005 until 2008 in the government of Liberal premier Gordon Campbell.

TV career

Taylor was Miss Toronto 1964, and co-hosted CFTO-TV's After Four, a show for teenagers. She later appeared on several other CFTO shows, including Toronto Today, Topic, and her own Carole Taylor Show. She and Percy Saltzman were the first co-hosts of Canada AM when the show premiered on CTV in 1972. She has also been the host of W-FIVE and Pacific Report. Her career in journalism lasted for over 20 years.

Political life
In Vancouver, she served as an independent member of Vancouver City Council from 1986 to 1990. She served as chair of the Vancouver Board of Trade from 2001 to 2002.

She was chair of the Canadian Broadcasting Corporation from July 16, 2001, until March 14, 2005, when she resigned to seek the nomination of the British Columbia Liberal Party in that province's 2005 election. On May 17, 2005, she was elected to Legislative Assembly of British Columbia in the 2005 election as the member representing Vancouver-Langara.  On June 16, 2005, she was named Minister of Finance.

As the Minister of Finance, she signed up 100% of all BC public sector contracts before they were set to expire.  Perhaps her most controversial achievement was the introduction of the first carbon tax in North America.

On November 30, 2007, she announced that she would not be running for re-election in the 2009 election. In one of her last acts as Finance Minister, Carole Taylor ended the corporate capital tax on banks—$100 million a year in government revenue. Upon leaving government, Taylor joined the TD Bank board where she stood to earn $145,000 to $300,000 per year. She was courted to run for mayor of Vancouver in the 2008 municipal election, she announced on January 8, 2008, that she would not run.

On December 18, 2008, she announced her resignation from the Legislative Assembly after accepting an appointment to a federal Ministry of Finance advisory panel.

Personal life
She is the widow of former Vancouver mayor Art Phillips.

Education
Carole Taylor graduated from Weston Collegiate Institute in 1964. She later attended Victoria University, Toronto at the University of Toronto and graduated with a BA in English in 1967.

Awards
 Doctor of Laws honoris causa  – Justice Institute of British Columbia, 2009

References

External links

 Biography at Canadian Communications Foundation

1945 births
Living people
British Columbia Liberal Party MLAs
Businesspeople from Toronto
Businesspeople from Vancouver
Canadian Broadcasting Corporation people
Canadian television journalists
Canadian university and college chancellors
Canadian women academics
Canadian women television journalists
Members of the Order of British Columbia
Women government ministers of Canada
CTV Television Network people
Directors of Toronto-Dominion Bank
Finance ministers of British Columbia
Officers of the Order of Canada
Journalists from Toronto
Politicians from Toronto
University of Toronto alumni
Members of the Executive Council of British Columbia
Weston
Vancouver city councillors
Women academic administrators
Female finance ministers
Women MLAs in British Columbia
Women municipal councillors in Canada
20th-century Canadian politicians
20th-century Canadian women politicians
21st-century Canadian politicians
21st-century Canadian women politicians
Canadian academic administrators
Chancellors of Simon Fraser University